Euphorbia orthoclada is a species of plant in the family Euphorbiaceae. It is endemic to Madagascar.  Its natural habitats are subtropical or tropical dry forests, subtropical or tropical dry shrubland, and rocky areas. It is threatened by habitat loss.

References

Endemic flora of Madagascar
orthoclada
Least concern plants
Taxonomy articles created by Polbot
Taxa named by John Gilbert Baker